Brătila River may refer to:

 Brătila, a tributary of the Zârna in Argeș County
 Brătila, a tributary of the Tazlău in Bacău County

See also 
 Bratu River